= Bachi, Belagavi =

Bachi
- Village
- Country: India
- State: Karnataka
- District: Belagavi

Languages
  - Official: Kannada
- Time zone: UTC+5:30 (IST)

Bachi is a village in Belgaum taluka of Belagavi district in the southern state of Karnataka, India. According to the 2011 Census of India, the population was 956 individuals. The village is listed in the Primary Census Abstract for Belgaum District with village code 597721.
